Aurelius Group is an investment company with offices in five European countries.

History 
In 2005, Dirk Markus and Gert Purkert, both former McKinsey consultants, founded Aurelius as a privately held investment vehicle investing in small- and medium-sized companies.

On 1 October 2015 Aurelius changed from a joint-stock company into an SE & Co. KGaA.

In April 2021, Aurelius announced that it had launched a €500 million investment fund specializing in corporate spin-offs and companies in transition, whose investors include US and European university endowments, pension funds, insurance companies and family offices.

Divisions 
Due to Aurelius Group’s  approach to buying and developing value assets, it is often referred to as the German Berkshire Hathaway. It has five divisions:

 Aurelius Equity Opportunities
 Aurelius Growth Investments
 Aurelius Real Estate Opportunities
 Aurelius Finance Company
 Aurelius Refugee Initiative
Aurelius Growth Investments is a long-term oriented private equity investor focussed on succession solutions for small and medium enterprises in Europe. Aurelius Real Estate Opportunities focuses on investments in residential, office, retail, hotel and care properties as well as multi-storey and underground car parks. Aurelius Finance Company is an alternative lender providing capital to European companies. Non-profit charity Aurelius Refugee Initiative e.V. Aurelius conducts a support and aid program for people with migration backgrounds.

Recent acquisitions 
In August 2019 Aurelius carved out the European operations of ceiling tile and grids business Armstrong from Knauf International. The acquisition was completed in April 2020.

Additionally, in August 2019 BT Group sold BT Fleet Solutions to Aurelius. BT Fleet solutions was renamed to Rivus Fleet Solutions.

Aurelius  acquired VAG, a Mannheim-based manufacturer of water and waste water valves from US-based Rexnord. VAG generated sales of approximately €200 million in its 2017/18 fiscal year with about 1,200 employees.

In 2018, it bought Ideal World, a British home-shopping TV Channel, and acquired Connect Books from Connect Group,  renaming it  to Bertrams Group.

In 2016, it acquired the European Business of Office Depot and bought Calumet Photographic, Europe's largest photo equipment dealer.

In 2014, the firm acquired the shoe business of Dr. Scholls from Reckitt Benckiser.

In April 2022, Aurelius completed the acquisition of McKesson UK and its UK businesses in a £477m deal. The companies acquired by Aurelius include LloydsPharmacy, and AAH Pharmaceuticals.

In April 2021, Aurelius completed the acquisition of SSE Contracting From SSE PLC for £27m.

Recent exits 
Scandinavian Cosmetics Group was sold to Accent Equity for €60 million in October 2019.

The solid board and printed carton business of the Smurfit Kappa Group, acquired in April 2015, with production sites in the Netherlands, Belgium and the UK, which was later renamed Solidus Solutions, was sold to Centerbridge in June 2019 with a multiple of 16 for €330 million. This was the largest exit in the company's history to date for  Aurelius.

In 2017, it sold Getronics for €220 million; it had been acquired from KPN in 2012. That year, it also sold  Secop for €185 million, which had been acquired from Danfoss in 2010.

External links

References 

Multinational companies headquartered in Germany
Investment companies of Germany
German companies established in 2005
Financial services companies established in 2005